Charmaine Brooks is a Canadian rock singer and songwriter born in Stratford, Ontario, Canada. Charmaine began learning to play guitar at an early age, she then switched to drums, and began studying under local drummer Wayne Brown.
She said " singing was not something I ever thought I could do well"

Her musical influences she credits as Melissa Etheridge, Patty Smyth (Scandal) Sheryl Crow, Lisa Marie Presley and fellow Canadians Sass Jordan, Jann Arden and Alannah Myles, whom she just might have been trying to be in her first band The Mixx who supported local Canadian groups Helix and Big House.

One of her biggest influences she credits is the 1988 movie "Satisfaction" starring Justine Bateman and Liam Neeson, and the lead guitarist in the film who played Billy, Britta Phillips

In 1995 Brooks quit The Mixx to concentrate on writing songs, before returning to performing live with She Says So, a name she says she made up herself, that group never lasted and were soon disbanded.

"Fill Me Up", her debut CD was released in 2005, she co produced the album with good friend Kathy Luckhardt, while playing guitar (on most tracks) bass guitar and drums. The album took almost a year to record. Links to the CD were put on the internet in a bid to generate some interest; Jordismusic.com was one site that she received some response from, another was from the Melissa Etheridge Information Network, where she learnt from one of the network's members about an all women internet radio station called NTG Radio. NTG was named after Melissa's 1995 song, "Nowhere to Go". After some meetings with the station owners of NTG, Charmaine became a part of the NTG family. NTG evolved into WomenRock Radio in late 2006.

Since 2005, she has hosted her own interview show called Doing Time, in which she has interviewed female artists like Britta Phillips (her first interview), Alannah Myles, Sophie B Hawkins, Taylor Dayne, Suzi Quatro, Dilana, Storm Large and fellow Canadian Sass Jordan to name just a few. Her unique one on one interview style highlights not only the artist and their music but also the character that is Charmaine Brooks, funny, flirtatious and very contagious.

In 2007, Charmaine interviewed rocker Melissa Etheridge about her CD "The Awakening". You can hear the full interview at  *

Charmaine's show, "Doing Time", is featured on www.womenrockradio.com

Track listing

Please Don't Go
Time Like This
Fly Away
How Can I Say Goodbye
To Be in Love
Everybody's Gone
Cry in The Dark
Broken Promises
Black Jaguar
I Still Love You
You Deserve So Much Better
Fill Me Up

References
Citations

External links
Official Website
Charmaine on myspace
NTG Radio
 Women Rock Radio

External links
Women Rock Radio
CD Baby
imdb.com

1970 births
Living people
People from Stratford, Ontario
Canadian women rock singers
Canadian singer-songwriters
Canadian women guitarists
Canadian rock drummers
Musicians from Ontario
Canadian women drummers
21st-century Canadian women singers
21st-century Canadian guitarists
21st-century Canadian drummers
21st-century women guitarists